Muhammad Asyraf Azan (born 3 October 1988), known as Muhd Asyraf Azan or Asyraf Azan, is a professional squash player who represented Malaysia. He reached a career-high world ranking of World No. 53 in December 2012.

References

External links 
 
 

1988 births
Living people
Malaysian male squash players
Malaysian people of Malay descent
Malaysian Muslims
People from Selangor